Drupadia cinesoides is a butterfly in the family Lycaenidae. It was described by British entomologist Lionel de Nicéville in 1889. It is found in the Indomalayan realm (Peninsular Malaya, Sumatra).

References

Butterflies described in 1889
Drupadia